Monique Knol (born 31 March 1964 in Wolvega, Friesland) is a former racing cyclist from the Netherlands, who won a medal in two consecutive Summer Olympics (gold and bronze), starting in 1988 in Seoul, South Korea. There she won the road race, taking a bronze in the same event four years later in Barcelona, Spain. She later retired from competitive cycling.

See also
 List of Dutch Olympic cyclists

References

External links

  Dutch Olympic Committee

1964 births
Living people
Dutch female cyclists
Cyclists at the 1988 Summer Olympics
Cyclists at the 1992 Summer Olympics
Olympic cyclists of the Netherlands
Olympic gold medalists for the Netherlands
Olympic bronze medalists for the Netherlands
People from Weststellingwerf
Olympic medalists in cycling
UCI Road World Champions (women)
UCI Road World Championships cyclists for the Netherlands
Cyclists from Friesland
Medalists at the 1988 Summer Olympics
Medalists at the 1992 Summer Olympics
20th-century Dutch women
21st-century Dutch women